is a public park in Toshima, Tokyo, Japan. It is adjacent to Ikebukuro Station West Exit Bus Terminal.

Overview
There is a fountain in the center of the park that is illuminated at night. In addition, there are several objects in the park that are shaped like people, creating an atmosphere suitable for a park in front of a theatre (Tokyo Metropolitan Theatre). Most of the ground is covered with tiles.

Access
 By train: About a 1-minute walk from Ikebukuro Station.

See also
 Parks and gardens in Tokyo
 National Parks of Japan

References

 Website of Toshima City (in Japanese)

External links
 Website of Extreme illumination (in Japanese)
Parks and gardens in Tokyo